Kemal Pasha dessert (Turkish: Kemalpaşa tatlısı) is a Turkish dessert dish. It originates from the district of Mustafa Kemalpaşa, Bursa, in Turkey. Traditionally it is made using a cheese variety that is particular to the region.

The dessert is prepared from a dough of flour, unsalted cheese, semolina, egg, water and baking powder. The dough is formed into small balls that are fried and then boiled in syrup. It can be eaten fresh or dried. In dried form it is often packaged in boxes of 24-50 portions. It is served with cream in winter and with ice cream in summer.

See also
 Bamiyeh
 Tangyuan
 Chè xôi nước
 Loukoumades
 Doughnut holes

References

Turkish desserts
Things named after Mustafa Kemal Atatürk